Cane Ridge Cumberland Presbyterian Church is a historic church in Antioch, Tennessee.

It was built in 1859 and added to the National Register in 1976.

References

Presbyterian churches in Tennessee
Churches on the National Register of Historic Places in Tennessee
Churches completed in 1859
19th-century Presbyterian church buildings in the United States
Churches in Davidson County, Tennessee
Cumberland Presbyterian Church
National Register of Historic Places in Davidson County, Tennessee